Corteconcepción is a town and municipality located in the province of Huelva, Spain. According to the 2005 census, it has a population of 620 inhabitants and covers a  area( people/km²).

References

External links

Corteconcepción - Sistema de Información Multiterritorial de Andalucía

Municipalities in the Province of Huelva